The 1982 Ms. Olympia contest was an IFBB professional bodybuilding competition was held on October 22, 1983, in Warminster, Pennsylvania. It was the 4th Ms. Olympia competition held.

Results

See also
 1983 Mr. Olympia

References

 1983 Ms Olympia Results

External links
 Competitor History of the Ms. Olympia

Ms Olympia, 1983
Ms. Olympia
Ms. Olympia
History of female bodybuilding

es:Ms. Olympia
it:Ms. Olympia
he:גברת אולימפיה
nl:Ms. Olympia
pl:Ms. Olympia
pt:Ms. Olympia
sv:Ms. Olympia